A by-election for the seat of Fitzroy in the Victorian Legislative Assembly was held on Wednesday 4 February 1925. The by-election was triggered by the death of Labor member John Billson on 23 December 1924.

The candidates were Maurice Blackburn for the Labor Party, and independent Joseph Alfred Boell, a councillor in the Fitzroy Council and three-time mayor of Fitzroy. Blackburn had held the seat of Essendon in the assembly from 1914 to 1917, having won the by-election triggered by the resignation of the Nationalist Premier William Watt. Labor retained the seat with Blackburn winning by a large majority.

Results

References

1925 elections in Australia
Victorian state by-elections
1920s in Melbourne